Iota (uppercase: Ι, lowercase: ι) is the ninth letter of the Greek alphabet. It was derived from the Phoenician letter Yodh. Letters that arose from this letter include the Latin I and J, the Cyrillic І (І, і), Yi (Ї, ї), and Je (Ј, ј), and iotated letters (e.g. Yu (Ю, ю)). In the system of Greek numerals, iota has a value of 10.

Iota represents the close front unrounded vowel . In early forms of ancient Greek, it occurred in both long  and short  versions, but this distinction was lost in Koine Greek. Iota participated as the second element in falling diphthongs, with both long and short vowels as the first element. Where the first element was long, the iota was lost in pronunciation at an early date, and was written in polytonic orthography as iota subscript, in other words as a very small ι under the main vowel. Examples include ᾼ ᾳ ῌ ῃ ῼ ῳ. The former diphthongs became digraphs for simple vowels in Koine Greek.

The word is used in a common English phrase, "not one iota", meaning "not the slightest amount". This refers to iota, the smallest letter, or possibly yodh, י, the smallest letter in the Hebrew alphabet. The English word jot derives from iota. The German, Portuguese, and Spanish name for the letter J (Jot / jota) is derived from iota.

Symbol

 In some programming languages (e.g., A+, APL, C++, Go), iota (either as the lowercase symbol ⍳ or the identifier iota) is used to represent and generate an array of consecutive integers. For example, in APL ⍳4 gives 1 2 3 4.
 The lowercase iota symbol is sometimes used to write the imaginary unit, but more often Roman i or j is used.
 In mathematics, the inclusion map of one space into another is sometimes denoted by the lowercase iota.
 In logic, the lowercase iota denotes the definite descriptor.
 The lowercase iota symbol has Unicode code point U+03B9 and the uppercase U+0399.

Character encodings

Greek Iota / Ypogegrammeni

Coptic Iaude

Latin Iota

Cyrillic Iota

Technical Iota

Mathematical Iota

These characters are used only as mathematical symbols. Stylized Greek text should be encoded using the normal Greek letters, with markup and formatting to indicate text style.

References

Greek letters
Vowel letters